Caloplaca is a lichen genus comprising a number of distinct species. Members of the genus are commonly called firedot lichen, jewel lichen. gold lichens, "orange lichens", but they are not always orange, as in the case of C. albovariegata. The distribution of this lichen genus is worldwide, extending from Antarctica to the high Arctic. It includes a portion of northern North America and the Russian High Arctic. There are about thirty species of Caloplaca in the flora of the British Isles.  An example species in this genus is Caloplaca saxicola, a lichen with worldwide distribution including the Antarctic continent, Europe and  northern North America including the northern reaches of the Canadian boreal forests.

A new species of Caloplaca, C. obamae, the first species to be named in honor of Barack Obama, was discovered in 2007 on Santa Rosa Island in California and published in March 2009.

List of species
List of Caloplaca species

Gallery

References

Lichen genera
Teloschistales genera
Taxa named by Theodor Magnus Fries
Taxa described in 1871